First Presbyterian Church of Pulaski is a historic church at 202 S. Second Street in Pulaski, Tennessee.

It was built in 1882 and added to the National Register in 1983.:)

References

Presbyterian churches in Tennessee
Churches on the National Register of Historic Places in Tennessee
Gothic Revival church buildings in Tennessee
Churches completed in 1882
19th-century Presbyterian church buildings in the United States
Churches in Giles County, Tennessee
National Register of Historic Places in Giles County, Tennessee